Nicolás Vélez (born 4 July 1990) is an Argentine professional footballer who plays as a forward for Thai League 3 club Pattaya Dolphins United .

Club career

Early football life
Velez is a product of the famed River Plate youth academy having played in the same team as Erik Lamela and Roberto Pereyra, before leaving for another top-tier Argentinian team, Huracan, in search of first-team opportunities.

Huracán
Nicolás Vélez started his professional footballing career with Club Atlético Huracán at the age of 19.

Atlético Sanluqueño
After being released by his former club in Argentina,  he joined Spanish 3rd tier club Atlético Sanluqueño. He left the club in 2013, saying there were “many problems” at the Spanish club, so he asked his agent to look at options elsewhere.

Warriors FC
He signed for Warriors FC in the S.League in 2014. He scored a hat-trick for the Warriors against Albirex Niigata (S) in a 4–0 victory, keeping them in contention of the title. In his first season in Singapore, he scored an impressive 21 goals in 26 appearances, second only to Brazilian Rodrigo Tosi (24 goals) helping Warriors FC to the S.League title. Velez capped his first Asian campaign by being named S.League young player of the year.

In the 2015 Singapore Charity Shield which doubled as the first league game of the 2015 season, Vélez scored the only goal of the match, winning the Shield and the first three points of the season for the Warriors. He scored two goals in the next game, a 3–1 win over Harimau Muda. He notched his sixth goal of the season on 24 April 2015 against fellow title contenders Brunei DPMM FC before earning a red card in the 69th minute following an on-field spat.

The South American also earned call-ups to Singapore Selection sides that took on Juventus, Arsenal and Stoke City in the last 18 months.

NorthEast United FC
In August 2015 Velez announced that he has decided to join Indian Super League side NorthEast United. On his joining the Indian side he said "I'm very happy to have this chance, but I'm sad to leave Warriors, because I am leaving behind many friends in Singapore.I want to say 'thank you' to my club for giving me the chance to show what I can do alongside some of the best players in the world". After debuting on 6 October 2015 he scored his first goal on the same night in 82 minute with a losing effort against Kerala Blasters. He ended the season with 5 goals, marking his name as the top goal scorer for the club.

Hajduk Split
In January 2016, Vélez joined the Croatian First Football League club Hajduk Split and signed the contract with a two and half years. He made his debut on 13 February 2016 in a 2–0 win against Slaven Belupo. On 30 June 2016, he was released from Hajduk.

NorthEast United FC
In the third season of Indian Super League, Velez made his 2nd appearance for the club and assisted Katsumi Yusa for the first winning goal against Kerala Blasters on the night of October 1, 2016 when the season officially kicked off. Velez was awarded the Hero of the Match in the 41st Match of the season between NorthEast United FC and Atlético de Kolkata.

Negeri Sembilan
Velez joined newly promoted side Negeri Sembilan for the 2018 Malaysian Super League season after leaving Suphanburi at the end of 2017. He scored his first goal when playing against fellow promoted side, Kuala Lumpur in a 2–0 home win.

Belenenses
In January 2019, he joined Belenenses.

PSS Sleman 
In March 2021, it was announced that he joined PSS Sleman, and was immediately playing for the club in 2021 Menpora Cup. In May 2021, he resigned from Sleman.

Sukhoithai 
In June 2021, Velez joined Sukhothai.

Pattaya Dolphins United 
On 17 December 2021, Velez announced through his Instagram account that he had joined Pattaya Dolphins United.

Phitsanulok FC 

Career statistics

Club

Honours

Club
Warriors FC
S.League: 2014
PSS Sleman

 Menpora Cup third place: 2021

Individual
 S.League Young Player of the Year: 2014

References

External links
 

Living people
1990 births
Singapore Premier League players
Expatriate footballers in Singapore
Expatriate footballers in Croatia
Argentine footballers
Argentine expatriate sportspeople in Spain
Association football forwards
Argentine Primera División players
Primera Nacional players
Atlético Sanluqueño CF players
Segunda División B players
Warriors FC players
HNK Hajduk Split players
Croatian Football League players
NorthEast United FC players
Indian Super League players
Nicolas Velez
Nicolas Velez
Negeri Sembilan FA players
Malaysia Premier League players
Belenenses SAD players
Primeira Liga players
Footballers from Buenos Aires